Chester station may refer to:

 Chester railway station, a railway station in Chester, England
 Chester station (Toronto), a subway station in Toronto, Ontario

See also
 Chester Transportation Center, a SEPTA bus and train station in Pennsylvania
 Western Railroad Stone Arch Bridges and Chester Factory Village Depot, in western Massachusetts